Morris "Red" (also "Rusty") Rudensky (born Macy Motle Friedman; August 16, 1898 – April 21, 1988) was an American prohibition-era gangster, cat burglar and safe-cracker. While incarcerated at United States Penitentiary, Atlanta, Rudensky became a well-known writer for an inmate-run magazine called The Atlantian. Following his release from prison, he became a spokesman and security consultant for several companies, and wrote a memoir titled The Gonif.

Early life and career
Born to a Jewish family on Manhattan's Lower East Side, Rudensky began his career by stealing bagels. At age 13 he was deemed incorrigible and sent to the Elmira State Reformatory. He escaped to make his way to Chicago where he cracked safes for the best price. He claimed to work for Al Capone's Chicago Outfit, Bugs Moran's North Side Mob, and The Purple Gang, a group of Jewish mobsters based in Detroit. He also traveled, cracking safes in Kansas City, St. Louis and San Francisco.

He later became known as an escape artist, successfully escaping from the Pontiac State Reformatory, where he was serving ten-years-to-life for the robbery of the Argo State Bank. Rudensky also claimed to be the mastermind behind the theft of $2.1 million in whiskey from a federal warehouse in Kansas City, Missouri, though no contemporaneous coverage confirms this claim. Rudensky continued to operate a well-organized theft ring in the Midwest robbing various payroll deliveries, distilleries, banks, and trains, and did freelance work for Egan's Rats and Al Capone.

At the age of twenty-one, Rudensky was again in prison, where he was known as "King of the Cons" for frequently getting into fights, and made several escape attempts successfully escaping briefly, after packing himself in a box being taken out of the prison print shop, but was soon caught.

He became friends with communist Earl Browder, in prison, who taught him English and encouraged him to write.

Reform
During a prison uprising on August 1, 1929, Rudensky saved the life of inmate Charlie Ward, the future president of the Brown & Bigelow advertising firm. After befriending Ward, Rudensky became convinced to stop criminal activities, and after being transferred to United States Penitentiary, Atlanta Rudensky began to work on the prison newspaper, The Atlantian, later becoming its editor. In Atlanta he was the cellmate of Al Capone. Although Rudensky expected to serve as Capone's subordinate and errand-runner, Capone's failing health and Rudensky's position in the prison led to him acting as guardian to Capone in response to hostility from other inmates and corrections officers.

Shortly after the attack on Pearl Harbor, he wrote a popular essay for The Atlantian titled "Memorandum of Faith.” In the essay, he called on prisoners to support the United States and redouble their commitments to wartime production. He was later awarded a commendation by President Franklin Delano Roosevelt for his efforts along with Attorney General Francis Biddle.

In 1955, Rudensky was released from Illinois State Penitentiary, Menard on parole. He took a job as a copy editor from Brown & Bigelow, and later became chief consultant for the 3M Corporation Security Systems. In 1970, Rudensky published his autobiography The Gonif, which is Yiddish for thief. During the 1970s and 1980s, he lectured for a time visiting schools in the St. Paul and Minneapolis metro areas, including in the renowned Minnesota educator Dr. Ida Kugler's fifth-grade class at Hancock-Hamline Magnet School, trying to deter students from the life of crime he had followed. In 1975, he made a public appearance as Paul Eakins toured the country with a V-16 Cadillac once owned by Al Capone.

In his later years he formed the Red Rudensky Variety Show, a troupe that toured nursing homes, and he was a regular in the St. Paul Clown Club, entertaining in children's hospital wards.

Red lived in semi-retirement in the Sholom Home, a nursing home in St. Paul, Minnesota, until his death on April 21, 1988.

References

English, T. J. Paddy Whacked: The Untold Story of the Irish American Gangster. New York: HarperCollins, 2005. 
Sifakis, Carl. The Mafia Encyclopedia. New York: Da Capo Press, 2005.

Further reading
Kobler, John. Ardent Spirits PB: The Rise and Fall of Prohibition. New York: Da Capo Press, 1993. 
Johnson, Curt and R. Craig Sautter. The Wicked City: Chicago from Kenna to Capone. New York: Da Capo Press, 1998. 
Kobler, John. Capone: The Life and Times of Al Capone. New York: Da Capo Press, 2003. 
David Grann. Killers of the Flower Moon. The Osage Murders and the Birth of the FBI. New York, Doubleday, 2017.

External links
Morris Rudensky at Find a Grave
Blacklisted Journalist 
 A Fresh Start by Red Rudensky - Harpers Magazine - April 1964 
 The Gonif by Red Rudensky - Reviews

1898 births
1988 deaths
American people convicted of burglary
Al Capone associates
Jewish American gangsters
People from the Lower East Side
People from the Minneapolis–Saint Paul metropolitan area
Prohibition-era gangsters